Desmopachria barackobamai is a species of diving beetles, in the genus Desmopachria.

It was first described in 2015, by Dewanand Makhan, having been found in French Guiana. He named it after the 44th President of the United States, Barack Obama.

See also 
 List of things named after Barack Obama
 List of organisms named after famous people (born 1950–present)

References 

Dytiscidae
Species named after Barack Obama
Beetles described in 2015